Better is the tenth Korean-language studio album (twentieth overall) by South Korean singer BoA. It was released on December 1, 2020, by SM Entertainment, to commemorate her twentieth anniversary. The album features 11 tracks, with the title song serving as the album's lead single.

Background and release
On November 5, 2020, SM Entertainment announced that BoA will come back with her tenth Korean studio album titled Better, two years after the release of her ninth album Woman (2018). The album release marks the singer's twentieth anniversary since her debut in 2000. Preorders began the same day. A music video teaser for the lead single "Better" was released on November 30. The album was released on December 1, 2020, by SM Entertainment, through various music portals. The accompanying music video for "Better" was released in conjunction with the album's release.

"Better" is an alternative R&B written and arranged by longtime collaborator Yoo Young-jin. Alongside music production by Yoo, Aston Rudi, and Jay-Keyz, the song also contains a sample of "Like I Do" by Swedish singer AWA, who was given songwriting credits for the song.

The physical album was made available for purchase on December 2, 2020, and has two editions: regular and limited. The limited version was made available in two "special" editions: yellow and beige. A few hours after the album's release, BoA held an online live show titled "Better BoA" which was broadcast through Naver's V Live channel, where she introduced songs from the album.

Critical reception 
Better received critical acclaim from critics upon release, with several publications listing Better in their rankings of best albums of 2020. It was ranked at number six on Metro UK's list The 20 Best K-Pop comebacks of 2020 and at number one on Billboards The 10 Best K-Pop Albums of 2020. Billboard described the album as "one of her strongest records to date, and it's filled to the brim with songs that present her as someone assured in her artistry – its excellence is obvious." Additionally, the track Start Over was named the number one Best K-Pop B-Side of 2020 by MTV, which explained that "BoA's tangy, raspy-edged timbre is a compelling match for the song's pleading urgency and breathless declarations of "You're gonna love me, let me start over."

 Accolades 

 Track listing Notes'
 "Better" contains a sample of "Like I Do" performed by AWA.

Charts

Sales

References 

2020 albums
BoA albums
Korean-language albums
SM Entertainment albums